Jonas Dobler (born 4 May 1991) is a German cross-country skier. He competed in the World Cup 2015 season.

He represented Germany at the FIS Nordic World Ski Championships 2015 in Falun.

Cross-country skiing results
All results are sourced from the International Ski Federation (FIS).

Olympic Games

Distance reduced to 30 km due to weather conditions.

World Championships
1 medal – (1 bronze)

World Cup

Season standings

References

External links

1991 births
Living people
German male cross-country skiers
Olympic cross-country skiers of Germany
Cross-country skiers at the 2018 Winter Olympics
Cross-country skiers at the 2022 Winter Olympics
Tour de Ski skiers
People from Traunstein
Sportspeople from Upper Bavaria
FIS Nordic World Ski Championships medalists in cross-country skiing